Sebastian Fagerlund (born 6 December 1972) is a Finnish composer. He is described as “a post-modern impressionist whose sound landscapes can be heard as ecstatic nature images which, however, are always inner images, landscapes of the mind”.
Echoes of Western culture, Asian musical traditions, and heavy metal have all been detected in his music.

His output covers a wide variety of genres, ranging from chamber opera to chamber music and works for solo instruments. The most prominent are his concertos and his works for orchestra.

Together with clarinettist Christoffer Sundqvist, Fagerlund is Artistic Director of the RUSK Chamber Music Festival in Jakobstad, Finland in 2013.

Fagerlund was the Composer in Residence of the Royal Concertgebouw in Amsterdam for the 2016-17 season and in 2018 was the invited guest composer at the Aspen Music Festival. In the 2021-22 season, Fagerlund was Artist in Residence at the Tapiola Sinfonietta.

Early life 
Fagerlund was born in Pargas. After a year spent studying in the Netherlands, he applied for the Sibelius Academy to study composition and graduated from the class of Erkki Jokinen in 2004. He has also attended master classes with Michael Jarrell, Magnus Lindberg, Ivan Fedele and others.

Compositions 
The Clarinet Concerto (2006) marked a turning point in Fagerlund’s career as a composer, and was followed by the tone poem Isola (Island, 2007), another major orchestral work. Both works were premiered at the Korsholm Music Festival. His surrealistic chamber opera Döbeln (2009), constructed around hallucinations, won the Record of the Year Award of the Finnish Broadcasting Company (Yle) and was a commission from the West Coast Opera Kokkola. Further works include Ignite (2010) and the violin concerto Darkness in Light, written for Pekka Kuusisto and immensely successful when premiered in Tampere in September 2012. The concerto was partly inspired by the literature of Haruki Murakami. The guitar concerto Transit (2013), commissioned by Yle and premiered by Ismo Eskelinen has continued Fagerlund’s series of concertos.

Fagerlund has said: “A sort of primitivism is present in many of my works. As a result, rhythm, in particular, has become very important. I am fascinated by relentless drive and energy.”. Salient features of Fagerlund’s music are his interest in large-scale forms and details of them, and a view of music as the expresser of fundamental questions and existential experiences.

Works by Fagerlund have been performed around the world by the Singapore Symphony Orchestra, the Finnish Radio Symphony Orchestra, the Orchestra Sinfonica Nazionale della RAI, BBC Symphony Orchestra, Bergen Philharmonic Orchestra, the Gothenburg Symphony and the Dutch Radio Philharmonic Orchestra.

Prizes 
 2010 – Nominated for the Nordic Music Prize for Sky
 2010 – Record of the Year Award of the Yle music editors for the recording of Döbeln
 2011 – Emma Award for best classical, for the orchestral Isola
 2011 – Teosto Prize for the orchestral Ignite
 2011 – Ignite selected as a recommended work at the International Rostrum of Composers in Vienna
 2016 – Nominated for the Nordic Council Music Prize for Mana – Concerto for Bassoon and Orchestra
 2018 – Shortlisted in the International Opera Awards 2018 for Autumn Sonata
 2018 – Nominated for the Fondation Prince Pierre de Monaco Musical Composition Prize with Opera Autumn Sonata
 2019 – The Grand Cultural Prize awarded by the Swedish Cultural Foundation in Finland

Works

Works for the stage 
 Döbeln (opera), opera (2008–2009)
 Höstsonaten (Autumn Sonata), opera (2014–2016)

Works for orchestra or large ensemble 
 Renergies (2003)
 Partita (2007/09)
 Isola (2007)
 Ignite (2010)
 Stonework (2014–2015)
 Strings to the Bone (2015)
 Skylines Fanfare for Orchestra (2016)
 Drifts (2017)
 Water Atlas (2017-2018)
 Chamber Symphony (2021)
 Beneath (2022)

Works for soloist and orchestra 
 Emanations for solo clarinet, two percussion players, string orchestra (1998)
 Höga lågor, stilla vatten for solo soprano, solo mezzo-soprano, solo baritone and chamber orchestra (2003)
 Saxophone Concerto (2004)
 Clarinet Concerto (2005–2006)
 Violin Concerto Darkness in Light (2012)
 Stone on Stone for amplified cello and ensemble (2012)
 Silent Words (version for cello and string orchestra) (2013)
 Guitar Concerto Transit (2013)
 Bassoon Concerto Mana (2013‒2014)
 Cello Concerto Nomade (2018)
 Flute Concerto Terral (2021)

Chamber works 
 Imaginary Landscapes for ensemble (9 players) (2002)
 Short Stories for saxophone quartet (2002)
 Clarinet Quintet (2004)
 Breathe for clarinet, accordion and cello (2005–2006)
 Cadenza for clarinet and instrument with low range (2006)
 String Quartet no. 1 (2006–2007)
 Scherzic for viola and cello (2008)
 Sky for Baroque ensemble (2008)
 Traces and Shadows for cello and piano (2009–2010)
 Sky II for ensemble (10 players) (2009)
 Oceano for violin, viola and cello (2010–2011)
 Rush for violin, clarinet, two pianos and cimbalom (2010–2011)
 Exhibit for ensemble (2010)
 Fuel for clarinet, cello and piano (2010)
 Rounds for clarinet and piano (2011)
 Rush II “Aldeburgh Version” for violin, clarinet, cimbalom and piano 4 hands (2011)
 Sonata for clarinet and piano (2011)
 Silent Words for cello and piano (2013)
 Transient Light for horn, violin, cello and piano (2013)
 Stilla for violin and piano (2014)
 Windways for recorder quartet (2015–16)
 Octet Autumn Equinox for clarinet, bassoon, horn, 2 violins, viola, cello and double bass (2016)
 String Quartet No.2 From the Ground (2017)
 Fuel II for flute, clarinet, violin, violoncello, piano (2018)
 Woodlands Variations for bassoon and string quartet (2018)
 Remain for piano trio (2022)

Works for solo instrument 
 Flow for clarinet (1999)
 Ground for alto saxophone (1999/2001)
 Environs for organ (2003)
 Reminiscence for violin (2003)
 Recordanza for tenor recorder (2005)
 6 Piano Pieces (for young players) (2007)
 Licht im Licht for piano (2007)
 Kromos for guitar (2011)
 Woodlands for bassoon (2012)
 Materie for solo violin (2019)
 Recitativo for solo cello (2021)

Vocal and choral works 
 Liten svit for baritone and piano (2001)
 Revontulet soprano and piano (2001)
 Sinnlighetens fest for male choir (2002)
 Teckning (Drawing) for male choir (2006)
 Staden 3 songs for soprano and piano (2009)
 Nocturne for female choir (2010)
 Dream Land for male choir (2019)

Electro-acoustic works 
 Element for 8-channel tape (1998)

Discography 
 2022 – Breathe – Trio Klangspectrum, GENUIN
 2021 – Nomade – Cello Concerto, Water Atlas, Nicolas Altstaedt, cello, Finnish Radio Symphony Orchestra, cond. Hannu Lintu, BIS-2455
 2021 – Oceano – Chamber Music by Sebastian Fagerlund, String Quartet Meta4, Paavali Jumppanen, piano, Christoffer Sundqvist, clarinet, Hervé Joulain, horn, BIS-2324
 2020 – Kromos – 21st Century Guitar Music, Ismo Eskelinen, guitar, BIS-2395 
 2018 – Höstsonaten (Autumn Sonata), Anne Sofie von Otter, Erika Sunnegårdh, Helena Juntunen, Tommi Hakala, Nicholas Söderlund, Finnish National Opera Chorus & Orchestra, cond. John Storgårds, BIS-2357
 2018 – Stonework, Drifts, Transit – Guitar Concerto, Ismo Eskelinen, guitar, Finnish Radio Symphony Orchestra, cond. Hannu Lintu, BIS-2295
 2016 – Mana – Bassoon Concerto, Woodlands, Bram van Sambeek, bassoon, Lahti Symphony Orchestra, cond. Okko Kamu, BIS-2206 (with Bassoon Concerto by Kalevi Aho)
 2015 – Darkness in Light – Violin Concerto, Ignite, Pekka Kuusisto, violin, Finnish Radio Symphony Orchestra, cond. Hannu Lintu, BIS-2093.
 2011 – Clarinet Concerto, Partita, Isola, Christoffer Sundqvist, clarinet, Gothenburg Symphony Orchestra, cond. Dima Slobodeniouk, BIS-SACD-1707.
 2010 – Döbeln, West Coast Kokkola Opera, cond. Sakari Oramo, BIS-SACD-1780.
 2010 – Short Stories, The Academic Saxophone Quartet, OPTCD-10007-8.
 2010 – Licht im Licht, Risto-Matti Marin, ABCD 305.
 2009 – Imaginary Landscapes, Turku Ensemble, JJVCD-69.
 2007 – Northern Lights, Anu Komsi, soprano, Pia Värri, piano, ABCD 231.
 2005 – Saxophone Concerto, Olli-Pekka Tuomisalo, saxophone, Chamber Orchestra Avanti!, cond. Dmitri Slobodeniouk, JaseCD 0042.
 2003 – Imaginary Landscape, Uusinta Chamber Ensemble, UUCD 101.
 2002 – Sinnlighetens fest, Polytech Choir, cond. Juha Kuivanen, PKCD 19.
 2001 – Ground, Olli-Pekka Tuomisalo, alto saxophone, FSSCD-01001.
 2001 – Ground, Olli-Pekka Tuomisalo, alto saxophone, Risto-Matti Marin, piano, OPTCD-01003-4.
 2000 – Emanations, Turku Conservatoire Orchestra, Christoffer Sundqvist, clarinet, cond. Sauli Huhtala, KACD2001-2.

References

External links 
 Sebastian Fagerlund @ Edition Peters
 Entry at Music Finland (Finnish Music Information Centre)
 Sebastian Fagerlund profile at BIS
 Sebastian Fagerlund – full speed ahead. Article in the Finnish Music Quarterly 2/2011
 Sebastian Fagerlund, composer. Interview in ResMusica 13.2.2014

Finnish classical composers
Finnish male classical composers
1972 births
Living people
People from Pargas
21st-century classical composers
21st-century male musicians
Sibelius Academy alumni
21st-century Finnish composers